Sol is a given name, usually a form of "Solomon". Notable people with the name include:

 Sol Aragones (born 1977), Filipina broadcast journalist and politician
 Sol Bamba (born 1985), French-born Ivorian footballer
 Sol Bloom (1870–1949), member of the U.S. House of Representatives and entertainment entrepreneur
 Sol Brodsky (1923–1984), American comic book artist and key Marvel Comics executive
 Sol Campbell (born 1974), English footballer
 Sol Davis (born 1979), English footballer
 Sol Eisner, American soccer player
 Sol Gabetta (born 1981), Argentinian cellist
 Sol Hachuel (1817–1834), Jewish martyr and heroine
 Sol Halperin (1902–1977), American special effects artist
 Sol Heras (born 1987), English actor
 Sol Hoʻopiʻi (1902–1953), Hawaiian guitarist
 Sol Hurok (1888–1974), American impresario
 Sol Kaplan (1919–1990), American film and television music composer
 Sol Kerzner (1935–2020), South African businessman
 Sol Kimel (1928-2021), Israeli chemical physicist
 Sol Lesser (1890–1980), American film producer
 Sol LeWitt (1928–2007), American artist
 Sol Linowitz (1913–2005), American diplomat, lawyer, and businessman
 Sol Martinez Fainberg (born 2002), Spanish-Argentinian rhythmic gymnast 
 Sol Orwell (born 1983), entrepreneur
 Sol Plaatje (1876–1932), South African intellectual, journalist, linguist, politician, translator, and writer
 Sol Price (1916–2009), American businessman and founder of FedMart and Price Club
 Sol Saks (1910–2011), creator of the television comedy show Bewitched
 Sol Schiff (1917–2012), American table tennis player
 Sol Schoenbach (1915–1999), American bassoonist, teacher and pedagogue
 Sol C. Siegel (1903–1982), American reporter and film producer
 Sol Spiegelman (1914–1983), American molecular biologist
 Sol Star (1840–1917), businessman and politician
 Sol Tax (1907–1995), American anthropologist
 Sol Tolchinsky (1929–2020), Canadian basketball player
 Sol Trujillo (born 1951), American businessman
 Sol Wachtler (born 1930), American lawyer, politician, and disgraced ex-judge

See also
Saul (given name)
Solomon (name)

Hypocorisms
English masculine given names
Masculine given names